Mitch James is the debut studio album by New Zealand singer-songwriter Mitch James. It was released on 14 September 2018.

Track listing

Charts and certifications

Charts

Certifications

References

2018 debut albums